Malkumba-Coongie Lakes National Park is a protected area located in the north-east of South Australia about  north-west of Innamincka.

The national park was proclaimed on 31 March 2005 as the Coongie Lakes National Park under National Parks and Wildlife Act 1972 over a parcel of land previously part of the Innamincka Regional Reserve to "conserve significant wetlands, provide experiences for visitors and ensure that the core component of the Coongie Lakes system was protected." The national park is located on land that was included on the List of Wetlands of International Importance under the Ramsar Convention under the name, Coongie Lakes in 1987.

In 2014, it was renamed as the Malkumba-Coongie Lakes National Park. The national park is co-managed by the Department of Environment and Water (DEW), the Yandruwandha Yawarrawarrka Parks Advisory Committee and South Australian Arid Lands Natural Resources Management Board.

It is classified as an IUCN Category II protected area.

References

External links
Malkumba-Coongie Lakes National Park official webpage
Malkumba-Coongie Lakes National Park webpage on protected planet

National parks of South Australia
Protected areas established in 2005
2005 establishments in Australia
Far North (South Australia)
Co-managed protected areas in South Australia